Donnybrook is a suburb in Melbourne, Victoria, Australia,  north of Melbourne's Central Business District, located within the City of Whittlesea local government area. Donnybrook recorded a population of 2,100 at the 2021 census.

Bounded to the west by Merri Creek and in the east by Darebin Creek, the suburb consists of a railway station, general store, pub, spa and a small number of houses.

History

The town was likely named after the Donnybrook Parish in Dublin.

Kinlochewe Post Office opened in 1850 along the Hume Highway; it was known as Donnybrook from 1854 until 1874 and was then renamed Kalkallo.

The railway line was open in 1872 and the station and new village were named Donnybrook. Donnybrook Post Office opened in 1889.

Residential and commercial development

The Donnybrook area has had a number of development initiatives approved. These include:

 Donnybrook and Woodside Precinct Structure Plan: 37,300 to 44,700 residents was approved in 2017.
 English Street Precinct Structure Plan: 2,900 to 3,400 residents was approved in 2016.
 Northern Quarries Area: 5,600 to 6,800 residents was approved in 2017.

A pop-up public library click and collect service was established at the City of Whittlesea's Community Centre in the Olivine estate in Donnybrook in the first quarter of 2022. It is managed by Yarra Plenty Regional Library.

Transport

Bus
Two bus routes service Donnybrook:
 : Donnybrook station – Mandalay (Beveridge) via Olivine estate. Operated by Broadmeadows Bus Service.
 : Donnybrook station – Craigieburn station via Mickleham. Operated by Dysons.

Train
Donnybrook station is located on the North East line and is served by V/Line Seymour and Shepparton services.

Books on Donnybrook
Jones, Michael Nature's Plenty: a history of the City of Whittlesea, Sydney, N.S.W. Allen & Unwin, 1992

References

External links

 Donnybrook and Kalkallo, Victorian Places
 City of Whittlesea: Place Snapshot: Donnybrook

Towns in Victoria (Australia)
City of Whittlesea